The 2021 Liga 3 West Java (also known as Liga 3 MS Glow For Men PSSI Jawa Barat for sponsorship reason) will be the sixth season of Liga 3 West Java as a qualifying round for the national round of the 2021–22 Liga 3.

PSKC were the defending champion.

Teams

Series 1 teams
There are 22 teams participated in the league Series 1 this season.

Series 2 teams
There are 42 teams participated in the league Series 2 this season.

Series 1

First round
Group A
Semua pertandingan dimainkan di Stadion Si Jalak Harupat, Soreang.

Group B
Semua pertandingan dimainkan di Stadion Si Jalak Harupat, Soreang.

Group C
Semua pertandingan dimainkan di Stadion Patriot Chandrabhaga, Bekasi.

Group D
Semua pertandingan dimainkan di Stadion Patriot Chandrabhaga, Bekasi.

Second round
Group E
Semua pertandingan dimainkan di Stadion Si Jalak Harupat, Soreang.

Grup F
Semua pertandingan dimainkan di Stadion Patriot Chandrabhaga, Bekasi.

Knockout stage

Semifinals

Third place

Finals

Series 2

Venues
Series 1:
Patriot Chandrabhaga Stadium, Bekasi
Si Jalak Harupat Stadium, Bandung Regency
Series 2: TBD

References

Liga 3
Sport in West Java